Bronx Community Board 9 is a local government unit of the city of New York, encompassing the neighborhoods of Castle Hill, Parkchester, Soundview, Harding Park, Bronx River, Clason Point and Unionport. It is delimited by Westchester Creek to the east, Sheridan Boulevard to the west, the Cross Bronx Expressway and East Tremont Avenue to the north and the Bronx River and the East River to the south.

Community board staff and membership
The current chairperson of the Bronx Community board 9 is Brandon Ganaishlal. Its District Manager is William Rivera. 

The City Council members representing the community district are non-voting, ex officio board members. The council members and their council districts are:
 13th NYC Council District - Mark Gjonaj
 17th NYC Council District - Rafael Salamanca
 18th NYC Council District - Ruben Diaz, Sr.

Demographics
As of the United States Census, 2000, the community district has a population of 167,859, up from 155,970 in 1990 and 167,627 in 1980.
Of them, 92,734 (55.2%) are of Hispanic origin, 55,750 (33.2%) are Black, non-Hispanic, 7,065 (4.2%) are White, non-Hispanic, 6,151 (3.7%) are Asian or Pacific Islander, 538 (0.3%) American Indian or Alaska Native, 1,650 (1%) are some other race (non-Hispanic), and 3,971 (2.4%) of two or more races (non-Hispanic).

References

External links
 
 

Community boards of the Bronx
Soundview, Bronx